Samuele Damiani (born 30 January 1998) is an Italian professional footballer who plays as a midfielder for  club Palermo.

Club career
He made his Serie C debut for Lucchese on 3 September 2017 in a game against Pontedera.

On 21 August 2019, he joined Carrarese on loan.

On 21 January 2022, he moved on loan to Palermo. On 8 July 2022, Damiani returned to Palermo on a permanent basis and signed a four-year contract.

Career statistics

Club

References

1998 births
Living people
People from Poggibonsi
Italian footballers
Association football midfielders
Italy youth international footballers
Empoli F.C. players
S.S.D. Lucchese 1905 players
Carrarese Calcio players
Palermo F.C. players
Serie C players
Serie B players
Sportspeople from the Province of Siena
Footballers from Tuscany